Fluxà is a Spanish surname. Notable people with the surname include:

Gloria Fluxà (born 1981), Spanish businessperson and environmentalist
Miguel Fluxà Rosselló (born 1938), Spanish billionaire businessman
Sabina Fluxà (born 1980), Spanish businesswoman

Surnames of Spanish origin